The King's Cavalier is a 1950 historical adventure novel by the American writer Samuel Shellabarger. It takes place in Renaissance France during the reign of Francis I. It peaked at the third place on the bestselling fiction list in America.

References

Bibliography
 Beetz, Kirk H. Beacham's Encyclopedia of Popular Fiction, Volume 3. Beacham Publishing, 1996.
 Burt, Daniel S. The Chronology of American Literature: America's Literary Achievements from the Colonial Era to Modern Times. Houghton Mifflin Harcourt, 2004.
 McParland, Robert. Bestseller: A Century of America's Favorite Books. Rowman & Littlefield, 2018.

1950 American novels
American historical novels
Novels by Samuel Shellabarger
Novels set in France
Little, Brown and Company books
Novels set in the 16th century
Novels set in the Renaissance